Robert Daley (born 1930 in New York City), is an American writer of novels and non-fiction. He is the author of 31 books, six of which have been adapted for film, and a hundred or so magazine articles and stories. 

Daley graduated from Fordham University in 1951 and served in the Air Force during the Korean War. He spent six seasons as publicity director for the New York Giants of the National Football League in the days of Frank Gifford, Charlie Conerly and Sam Huff. He then worked on the foreign staff of The New York Times for six years based first in Nice, then in Paris, covering stories in sixteen countries in Europe and North Africa.

In 1971–72, he served as Deputy Commissioner of the New York City Police Department (NYPD). It was a particularly tumultuous period in the department's history: two Mafia dons were killed, the city's biggest-ever jewel heist took place, the Knapp Commission investigation into police corruption caused great upheaval in the department, and four police officers were assassinated by gunmen who claimed to be associated with the Black Liberation Army. Two others were machine-gunned in their car, riddled with bullets but did not die. He had a staff of thirty five, a car and drivers assigned to him around the clock. He witnessed headquarters infighting up close, took part in major decision-making, and saw crime scenes from inside the yellow tape. Daley recounted these events and others in the nonfiction book Target Blue, and he used the police background and his inside knowledge of police headquarters in a number of the novels that followed as well. He was the first professional writer ever to see the NYPD from so deep inside, and said later that when he agreed to take the job, he got more than he bargained for. 

Daley's award-winning 1978 nonfiction work Prince of the City was hailed by The New York Times Book Review: "The policeman as flawed hero, a recurrent and enormously popular figure in contemporary writing, has never been done better." Daley's books, which have been translated into 14 languages, also include Year of the Dragon and Tainted Evidence (filmed as Night Falls on Manhattan). Most of his books grew out of immersing himself deeply in studying people and subjects that fascinated him, from Grand Prix racing to opera to bullfights to treasure diving—and of course the NYPD. He and his French-born wife divide their time between suburban New York and an apartment in Nice, France.

Works

Novels
The Whole Truth (1967)
Only a Game (1967)
A Priest and a Girl (1969)
Strong Wine, Red as Blood (1975)
To Kill a Cop (1976) - basis of a 1978 TV movie of the same title and the TV series Eischied (1979)
The Fast One (1978)
Year of the Dragon (1981) - filmed by Michael Cimino as Year of the Dragon in 1985
The Dangerous Edge (1983)
Hands of a Stranger (1985) - filmed by Larry Elikann as Hands of a Stranger in 1987
Man with a Gun (1988)
A Faint Cold Fear (1990)
Tainted Evidence (1993) - filmed by Sidney Lumet as Night Falls on Manhattan in 1996
Wall of Brass (1994)
Nowhere to Run (1996)
The Innocents Within (1999)
The Enemy of God (2005)
Pictures (2006)
The Red Squad (2012)

Non fiction
The World Beneath the City (1959)
Cars at Speed (1961)
The Bizarre World of European Sports (1962)
The Cruel Sport (1963)
The Swords of Spain (1965)
A Star in the Family (1971)
Target Blue: An Insider's View of the N.Y.P.D. (1973)
Treasure (1977)
Prince of the City: The True Story of a Cop Who Knew Too Much (1978) - filmed by Sidney Lumet as Prince of the City in 1981
An American Saga - Juan Trippe and his Pan Am Empire (1980)
Portraits of France (1991)
Writing on the Edge (2014)

Poetry
MORE And Other Poems(2018)

External links

References

1930 births
Living people
Fordham University alumni
Writers from New York City